Andrei-Daniel Ilie (born 22 May 1990) is a Romanian rugby union footballer. He plays as a centre or wing. He most recently played for professional SuperLiga club, Farul Constanța.

Club career
During his career, Andrei Ilie played for CSM București, Farul Constanța, Dinamo București and once again for Farul Constanța.

Provincial / State sides
Ilie was also selected between 2014 and 2015 for the State side assembled to play in the European Cups, namely București Wolves.

International career
Ilie is also selected for Romania's national team, the Oaks, making his international debut during the 2014 IRB Nations Cup in a test match against Emerging Ireland.

References

External links

1990 births
Living people
Romanian rugby union players
Romania international rugby union players
CSM București (rugby union) players
RCJ Farul Constanța players
CS Dinamo București (rugby union) players
București Wolves players
Rugby union centres
Rugby union wings